The Corrigan House (also known as Nagirroc, which is Corrigan spelled backwards) is a historic home in Sarasota, Florida. It is located at 463 Sapphire Drive. On May 26, 1994, it was added to the U.S. National Register of Historic Places.

References and external links

 Sarasota County listings at National Register of Historic Places
 Sarasota County listings at Florida's Office of Cultural and Historical Programs

Houses on the National Register of Historic Places in Sarasota County, Florida
Houses in Sarasota, Florida
Mediterranean Revival architecture in Florida
Houses completed in 1926